These are the results for the 39th edition of the Ronde van Nederland cycling race, which was held from August 24 to August 28, 1999. The race started in Gouda (South Holland) and finished in Landgraaf (Limburg).

Stages

24-08-1999: Gouda-Tilburg, 178.3 km

25-08-1999: Utrecht-Coevorden, 186.1 km

26-08-1999: Coevorden-Denekamp, 85.5 km

26-08-1999: Nordhorn (GER)-Denekamp, 26.2 km

27-08-1999: Nijverdal-Venlo, 187.6 km

28-08-1999: Blerick-Landgraaf, 225 km

Final classification

External links
Wielersite Results

Ronde van Nederland
1999 in Dutch sport
1999 in road cycling
August 1999 sports events in Europe